Sir Ludovick Grant, 7th Baronet (13 January 1707 – 18 March 1773) was a Scottish Member of Parliament.

Grant was the son of Sir James Grant, 6th Baronet, and Anne Colquhoun. He succeeded his father as seventh Baronet of Colquhoun in 1747. In 1741 Grant was elected to the House of Commons for Elginshire, a seat he held until 1761.

Grant married firstly Marian Dalrymple. He married secondly Lady Margaret Ogilvy, daughter of the statesman James Ogilvy, 4th Earl of Findlater and 1st Earl of Seafield.

His final address in Edinburgh is given as Parliament Close.

He died in March 1773, aged 66, and was succeeded by his son from his second marriage, James Grant.

References

Grant, Ludovick, 7th Baronet
Grant, Ludovick, 7th Baronet
Grant, Sir Ludovick, 7th Baronet
Members of the Parliament of Great Britain for Scottish constituencies
British MPs 1741–1747
British MPs 1747–1754
British MPs 1754–1761
Lords of Parliament in the Jacobite peerage
Scottish clan chiefs